Yanovo is a rural locality (a selo) and the administrative center of Yanovsky Selsoviet, Zarinsky District, Altai Krai, Russia. The population was 452 as of 2013. There are 9 streets.

Geography 
Yanovo is located 41 km northeast of Zarinsk (the district's administrative centre) by road. Kamenushka is the nearest rural locality.

References 

Rural localities in Zarinsky District